Parmouti 16 - Coptic Calendar - Parmouti 18

The seventeenth day of the Coptic month of Parmouti, the eighth month of the Coptic year. In common years, this day corresponds to April 12, of the Julian Calendar, and April 25, of the Gregorian Calendar. This day falls in the Coptic Season of Shemu, the season of the Harvest.

Commemorations

Martyrs 

 The martyrdom of Saint James son of Zebedee, one of the Twelve Apostles

Saints 

 The departure of Saint Nicodemus

References 

Days of the Coptic calendar